, who uses the code name , is a fictional character in the Persona series, first appearing in Persona 5. A high school detective nicknamed "The Second Coming of the Detective Prince", Akechi opposes the Phantom Thieves' actions and becomes both a rival and a foil to Joker, the group's leader. For Persona 5 Royal, Akechi's characterization was further explored in order to appeal more to players. Besides printed and animated versions of the series, he has also been featured in the spin-offs Persona 5: Dancing in Starlight and Persona Q2: New Cinema Labyrinth.

Created by Shigenori Soejima, Akechi was developed to be a mysterious detective who would be the opposite of  Joker. Due to polarizing reception, Akechi was further explored in Royal. He is voiced by Sōichirō Hoshi in Japanese and Robbie Daymond in English. Initial critical reception towards his character has been mixed in both the first game and the anime television series despite ranking high on official character polls. However, upon the release of Royal, critics found Akechi more likable due to how Atlus started handling him in a different fashion from his original version.

Development

Akechi's character design was created by Shigenori Soejima. Early in development, the creative team decided he was going to be a detective but was unsure on how suspicious he would look or what role he would play in the story, with one early suggestion being that he was Makoto Niijima's brother. Eventually, the team decided to make him look well-behaved with a cheerful personality, leaving his collar button unbuttoned, his tie slightly loosened, and his hair messy. His main color is white to contrast with Joker's black color scheme. Akechi also wears black gloves, though at one point, the creative team believed it would give him away as the group's traitor.

For Persona 5 Royal, due to Akechi's initial polarizing reception, Kazuhisa Wada noted the difficulties in making sure Akechi seemed true to his character during the third semester. The new events where Akechi socializes with Joker were made to appeal to the audience that disliked his original take as well as to expand more of his character. The new battle dialogue for Akechi was initially "wilder", but because Wada and Daiki Ito found Hoshi's voice acting too strong, he was asked to re-record them. Late in development, the art team suggested on giving Akechi different character portraits, including his default stern expression, as a way for Akechi to show his "true" self around the Phantom Thieves and, especially, Joker. Other than Joker, Akechi does not care for anyone else, which is exemplified in how he scolds Sumire Yoshizawa for missing her attacks. Wada also stated that other than a rival, Akechi is also considered a deuteragonist.

Akechi's first Persona is Robin Hood, a "hero of justice" who matches Akechi's "superhero" image. His second Persona is Loki, who has a dazzle camouflage pattern likened to World War I battleships to disguise from enemies, as well as horns similar to leucochloridium parasites to make its origins less clear. In Persona 5 Royal, during the game's third semester, Akechi gains Hereward as his Ultimate Persona.

Akechi is voiced by Sōichirō Hoshi in Japanese and Robbie Daymond in English. Hoshi described Akechi as a high school detective and a "refreshing young man", but notes that is not all that defines him. Daymond was surprised by the impact of his character. Revisiting the game following recording, Daymond found it surreal due to how he kept looking about Akechi's character, finding him fun to play and wondering if he could inspire another meme.

Appearances

In Persona 5

Akechi is a playable character in Persona 5, with his character first revealed to the public during E3 2016. As a Confidant, Akechi represents the Justice Arcana. In the game, he is a third-year high school student and celebrity detective known as "The Second Coming of the Detective Prince." He opposes the Phantom Thieves and becomes Joker's rival throughout the game, but he later joins them during Sae's Palace, using the code name "Crow." Akechi later betrays the Phantom Thieves, partly out of jealousy for Joker, and is revealed to be been the black masked assassin causing cognitive shutdowns ordered by Masayoshi Shido, a corrupt politician. Akechi confronts the Phantom Thieves again in Shido's Palace, revealing that he is Shido's illegitimate son and plots to get revenge on him after years of neglect. Like Joker, Akechi is also a "wild card" who can hold multiple Personas, a power given to him by Yaldabaoth to see whether chaos or order will dominate society. However, his "wild card" power failed to develop properly due to his nihilistic view of human relations. Akechi later sacrifices himself to save the Phantom Thieves when he learns that Shido had planned on having him killed after the election.

While playable only during the duration of Sae's Palace, in Persona 5 Royal, the updated re-release, Akechi was made playable in the third semester of the game with a new interactive Confidant and abilities. During the third semester, he aids Joker in investigating Maruki's Palace, this time interacting with him with his true personality. Near the end of the game, Maruki reveals that Akechi's return was through Joker's wish to save him. Wada and Ito intentionally made it so that Akechi's survival ultimately depended on the player's choice in the game, which can be achieved through certain choices made in his Confidant.

In other media

Akechi has also appeared in other spin-off titles, such as Persona 5: Dancing in Starlight as a downloadable content, and Persona Q2: New Cinema Labyrinth. Akechi also appears in Persona 5: The Animation  with more focus on his character compared to the game, a conscious decision made by director Masashi Ishihama and producer Kazuki Adachi, who both stated that without his "dark side", the anime would be "boring." Fashion brand SuperGroupies also created a collaboration apparel line based on Akechi and Joker. In the stage play adaptation, Akechi is portrayed by Yoshihide Sasaki. To prepare for the role, Sasaki completed Persona 5, stating that he was "shocked" upon seeing Akechi's sudden change and that he was looking forward to portraying his dual personalities.

Reception

Akechi was voted #1 by Japanese fans as their favorite Confidant in Persona 5 Maniacus and volume 12 of the magazine Comiket Plus. Comments from Comiket Plus stated that Akechi seemed to be a very "human" character and enjoyed his rivalry with Joker. Akechi was also voted #1 as the overall favorite character by attendees at Sega Festival 2016, with a consensus that he evoked "motherly feelings" from fans. Gita Jackson from Kotaku noted that Akechi was a favorite among Persona 5 fans due to the online reception of his inclusion in Persona 5: Dancing in Starlight. However, Chris Moyes from Destructoid regards Akechi as the "worst boy" of the series, describing him as having a "passive-aggressive attitude" and an "obsessional personality built upon narcissism and misplaced arrogance." In addition, Clayton Purdom from The A.V. Club found Akechi's character to be "air-dropped in from a kid's anime", and that he felt like a minor character due to "tipping the scales too far" between the "real-world darkness and over-the-top cheeriness" of the game. Pancakes also became an Internet meme associated with Akechi. Siliconera and GameSpot praised Akechi's characterization in Royal for providing more likable interactions with Joker. Polygon shared similar comments in the handling of Akechi in Royal, finding it superior than the original one.Comic Book Resources ranked Akechi and Joker's Showtime in 1st place, praising the special move for being filled with symbolism of their complicated but powerful relationship.

In his review of Persona 5: The Animation, Christopher Farris from Anime News Network felt the anime fleshed out Akechi's character in contrast to the game, also stating that his presence in the story builds a "sense of escalation" due to his opposition towards the Phantom Thieves. He cited Akechi's rivalry with Joker as "dynamic" and felt that their discussions about morality were "cozy" in spite of their animosity. However, he felt that the revelations about Akechi's character motivation seemed "last minute."

References

Characters designed by Shigenori Soejima
Fictional characters with evocation or summoning abilities
Fictional double agents
Fictional gentleman thieves
Fictional high school students
Fictional henchmen in video games
Fictional Japanese people in anime and manga
Fictional Japanese people in video games
Fictional detectives
Fictional murderers
Fictional swordfighters in video games 
Male characters in video games
Persona 5 characters
Sega antagonists
Teenage characters in anime and manga
Teenage characters in video games
Video game bosses
Video game characters introduced in 2016
Video game characters who have mental powers
Vigilante characters in video games